Following is a list of persons who have headed the United States Patent Office. The title associated with this function has changed over time, from Superintendent of Patents to Commissioner of Patents to Undersecretary of Commerce for Intellectual Property. The duties of the office have also evolved significantly, including coming to encompass the supervision of trademark issuance as well as that of patents.

Note:
a Dickinson served in analogous role as Assistant Secretary of Commerce and Commissioner of Patents and Trademarks beginning in 1998. That position was transformed into the Under Secretary of Commerce for Intellectual Property and Director of the United States Patent and Trademark Office effective January 17, 2001.

References

Lists of office-holders in the United States
United States Patent Office
United States Department of Commerce officials
United States intellectual property law
 
United States Commissioners of Patents
United States Superintendents of Patents